Fred Harker (12 May 1911 – 14 March 1999) was an English cricketer.  Harker was a right-handed batsman who bowled leg break.  He was born in Norton-on-Tees, County Durham.

Harker made a single first-class appearance in the British Raj for Bengal against United Provinces in the 1944/45 Ranji Trophy.  In Bengal's first-innings he was dismissed for a duck by S.N. Gandhi, while in their second-innings he was dismissed for 16 runs by J. Mehra.  He bowled during the United Provinces first-innings, taking the wicket of A. Majeed for the cost of 16 runs from 4 overs.  Later when he was back in England, he played two matches for Durham in the 1947 Minor Counties Championship, playing a match each against the Yorkshire Second XI and the Lancashire Second XI.

He died in Stockton-on-Tees, County Durham on 14 March 1999.

References

External links
Fred Harker at ESPNcricinfo
Fred Harker at CricketArchive

1911 births
1999 deaths
People from Norton, County Durham
Cricketers from County Durham
English cricketers
Bengal cricketers
Durham cricketers
Sportspeople from Yorkshire